Inkwanca Local Municipality was a local municipality that forms part of the Chris Hani District Municipality in the Eastern Cape province of South Africa. Inkwanca is an isiXhosa name meaning cold. The municipal area is the coldest area in the country and the lowest temperatures are recorded in the area every year. After municipal elections on 3 August 2016 it was merged into the larger Enoch Mgijima Local Municipality.

Geography
It abuts on the Gariep Local Municipality to the north, the Maletswai Local Municipality to the northeast, the Emalahleni Local Municipality to the east, the Lukhanji Local Municipality to the southeast and the Tsolwana Local Municipality to the southwest.

The population of the municipality according to the 2011 census was 21,971 people in 6,228 households. 89.1% of residents described themselves as "Black African", 6.2% as "White" and 4.1% as "Coloured". 85.8% speak Xhosa as their first language, 8.3% speak Afrikaans and 3.5% speak English. The two towns in the municipality are Molteno (pop. 11,553) and Sterkstroom (pop. 7,165).

Politics 
The municipal council consisted of seven members elected by mixed-member proportional representation. Four councillors were elected by first-past-the-post voting in four wards, while the remaining three were chosen from party lists so that the total number of party representatives was proportional to the number of votes received.

2011 election 
In the election of 18 May 2011 the African National Congress (ANC) won a majority of five seats on the council.
The following table shows the results of the election.

2014 election 
On 11 September 2014 the Inkwanca municipal council was dissolved, and new elections were held on 26 November. The African National Congress (ANC) again won a majority of five seats on the council.
The following table shows the results of the election.

References

External links
 Official website

Former local municipalities of South Africa
Enoch Mgijima Local Municipality